The Ratonero Bodeguero Andaluz (Andalusian wine-cellar rat-hunting dog) is a Spanish breed of dog of the terrier type. Its name reflects its main occupation: hunting rats and mice hidden between barrels in the wineries of Andalusia in Spain. It was recognised as an indigenous Spanish breed in 2000 by the Spanish Ministry of Agriculture and by the Spanish Kennel Club, the Real Sociedad Canina de España.

The Bodeguero Andaluz has been declared ‘Patrimonio Cultural Inmaterial’ (which translates to intangible cultural heritage) by the Ayuntamiento de Jerez de la Frontera in 2020 (the city hall of Jaen), this was highlighted by the delegate of Animal Welfare and Protection, due to their revulsive enhancement, the value of this breed and their connection to the cities and the wine cellars

Appearance 
The Ratonero Bodeguero Andaluz is of medium-sized breed, measuring between (37 - 43 cm, the ideal for males being 40 cm and for females 38 cm, in both sexes an extra cm is fine) at the withers.  Appearance-wise, they look like enlarged Jack Russell Terrier (they have longer and more enloganted limbs) to the extent that it has on occasion been called the Spanish Jack Russell. The breed is an agile dog with a lean and athletic build; the head is triangular with a semi-flat skull. The eyes are very dark and the Ratonero has a long muzzle, and high set ears that bend over at the tip. The tail is traditionally docked to one quarter of its length, however they may also be born with a natural bobtail.

The coat is short and dense, which is typically white. Its facial markings are a mixture of brown, white and black markings (known as tricolor), usually with tan-colored eyebrows.

Temperament 
The breed is lively and brave with strong hunting instincts. It must also be friendly and according to the breed club this breed is good with children.

This breed is lively, intelligent and has strong hunting instincts, highlighting especially their tenacious skills and attentiveness, which are needed when hunting for rodents. They have an impeccable sense of smell and sight, can coordinate their movements, and are extremely agile. They are known for their loyalty, friendliness, and their capability to adapt to environments.

History 

English wine merchants settling in the Sherry making region of Spain, Marco de Jerez, brought with them the ancestors of today's Fox Terrier breeds as long as several hundred years ago, where they were crossed with local dogs and used for vermin control of rats and mice in the wineries. In the 1900s, the Toy Terrier was crossed into the breed. In 1993, the first breed club, the Club Nacional del Perro Andaluz Ratonero Bodeguero, was formed, and a breed standard was written. In 2000 the breed was recognised as a native Spanish breed by the Spanish Ministry of Agriculture, although it is not yet recognised internationally by the Fédération Cynologique Internationale. The breed is recognised by numerous minor kennel clubs - such as the Nordic Kennel Union - and dog registries, especially in North America. As some of these groups require little to no verification before registering dogs as being of a certain breed, puppy buyers should research their dog's pedigree to make sure it is from Spain and not one of the many similar breeds of dogs derived from fox terriers.

Health 
No diseases specific to this breed, or claims of extraordinary health, have been documented for the Ratonero Bodeguero Andaluz, though an undescended testicle is not uncommon in male pups. 

Minor defects

Pink nose or lack of pigmentation in the nose. Short limbs. Shy or cowardly behavior.

Major defects

Long, curly, and hard hair. Over elongated body. Erect ears. Hanging ears or that go backward. Bite that it is not a scissor.

Care and necessities 
Although the Bodeguero is small in size, it is just like any other dog, the Bodeguero needs a lot of exercise. The ideal is to take them on walks three to four times a day, preferably for an hour so that they can burn all their energy.

In terms of feeding, it is convenient that you speak with your veterinarian. Most of the food that should be given to them should be either kibble or wet food that contains all the nutrients your dog needs.

When it comes to bathing and care, they should not be bathed more than once a month so that they don't lose their fatty protective layer. 

Being a dog with so much energy and nervousness, they tend to eat really quickly. It is recommended that you divide their daily food so that they eat less anxiously.

Education and training 
As this breed is a very active one, the recommendation is to train them at a young age. Although it is an intelligent breed, it should be taken into consideration that they can easily distract themselves, and that patience is needed. It is recommended to accustom them to be around children and other animals from a young age so that in the future they do not encounter socializing problems.

Similar breeds 
Breeds similar in appearance to (but not the same as) the Ratonero Bodeguero Andaluz include the Jack Russell Terrier, the Parson Russell Terrier, and the Rat Terrier. Differences and similarities between the Terrier Brasileiro and the Japanese Terrier are detailed on the breed club's website.

The breed has been compared with other ratting dog breeds that originated in Spain: Ratonero Murciano de Huerta and Ratonero Valenciano.  Their traits, intelligence, trainability, sociability, and behavior are all similar, but they differ only in size, color and conformation.  None of these breeds is recognized by the Fédération Cynologique Internationale.

See also
 Dogs portal
 List of dog breeds
 Hunt terrier
 Rat Terrier
 Ratonero Valenciano
 Terrier

References 

Terriers
Dog breeds originating in Andalusia